The Manfalut railway accident occurred on 17 November 2012 when a school bus, which was carrying about 70 school children between four and six years old, was hit by a train on a rail crossing near Manfalut, Egypt, 350 km (230 miles) south of the Egyptian capital Cairo. At least 50 children and the bus driver died in the crash, and about 17 people were injured. Witnesses reported that barriers at the crossing were not closed when the crash occurred.

After the crash, a number of people began searching along the tracks to find the remains of their children and victims they knew. Additionally, schoolbags and schoolbooks were scattered across the tracks. Police did not arrive until two hours after the accident, and by the time the first ambulance came, most of the children were dead. Afterwards, the families of the victims protested at the crash site.

The Egyptian minister of transportation, Mohammad Rashad Al Matini, and the head of the railways authority resigned after the accident. President Mohamed Morsi pledged to hold those responsible accountable.

References

2012 in Egypt
2012 road incidents
Asyut Governorate
Bus incidents in Egypt
Level crossing incidents in Egypt
Railway accidents in 2012
November 2012 events in Africa
2012 disasters in Egypt